A Small Death in Lisbon is a crime novel by Robert Wilson. The novel won the CWA Gold Dagger Award in 1999, and the German Crime Prize (for an International Novel) in 2003.

Notes 
 Zé Coelho shares some characteristics with his Spanish counterpart, Inspector jefe Javier Falcón, such as:
 Lost his wife; Falcón is divorced - they both long for their wives;
 Has stress problems, as Falcón;
 They both discover that past friendships are not as they seem: Coelho with his friend Borrego, and Falcón with his father.

Publication history
1999, London: HarperCollins , Pub date 19 July 1999, Hardback
2000, London: HarperCollins , Pub date 2 May 2000, Paperback
2000, New York: Harcourt , Pub date October 2000, Hardback
2002, New York: Berkeley Books , Pub date March 2002, Paperback

1999 British novels
Novels by Robert Wilson
Novels set in Lisbon
HarperCollins books
British crime novels